Acer monspessulanum, the Montpellier maple,  is a species of maple native to the Mediterranean region from Morocco and Portugal in the west, to Turkey, Syria, Lebanon, and Israel in the east, and north to the Jura Mountains in France and the Eifel in Germany.

Description
Acer monspessulanum is a medium-sized deciduous tree or densely branched shrub that grows to a height of 10–15 m (rarely to 20 m). The trunk is up to 75 cm diameter, with smooth, dark grey bark on young trees, becoming finely fissured on old trees. Among similar maples is most easily distinguished by its small three-lobed leaves, 3–6 cm long and 3–7 cm wide, glossy dark green, sometimes a bit leathery, and with a smooth margin, with a 2–5 cm petiole. The leaves fall very late in autumn, typically in November. The flowers are produced in spring, in pendulous, yellow to white corymbs 2–3 cm long. The samaras are 2–3 cm long with rounded nutlets.

Subspecies
It is variable, and a number of subspecies and varieties have been described, but few are widely accepted as distinct. The most widely accepted as distinct is Acer monspessulanum subsp. microphyllum (Boiss.) Bornmueller, from Turkey and Lebanon, with smaller leaves not over 3 cm broad.

The species can be mistaken for Acer campestre (field maple), another maple native to Europe, from which it is best distinguished by the clear sap in the leaves (milk-white in field maple), and the much narrower angle between the samara wings.

Cultivation
Among maples not endemic to Japan, A. monspessulanum (and the similar A. campestre) are popular among bonsai enthusiasts. In both cases, the smallish leaves and shrubby habit of the maple respond well to techniques to encourage leaf reduction and ramification. These bonsai have an appearance distinct from those created from maples such as Acer palmatum whose leaves are more frilly and translucent.

Otherwise, Acer monspessulanum is rarely seen in cultivation outside of arboreta. In the United States, a mature specimen may be seen at Arnold Arboretum in Boston, Massachusetts. A specimen can also be found in the arboretum of the Montreal Botanical Gardens.

References

External links
 
 Acer monspessulanum - genetic conservation units and related resources. European Forest Genetic Resources Programme (EUFORGEN)

monspessulanum
Flora of Europe
Flora of North Africa
Flora of temperate Asia
Plants described in 1753
Taxa named by Carl Linnaeus
Plants used in bonsai
Garden plants of Africa
Garden plants of Asia
Garden plants of Europe
Ornamental trees
Flora of the Mediterranean Basin